Heterodoxa is a genus of picture-winged flies in the family Ulidiidae.

Species
 H. fatuhivae
 H. hivaoae
 H. uahukae
 H. uapouae

References

Ulidiidae